Corral de Ayllón is a municipality located in the province of Segovia, Castile and León, Spain. According to the 2004 census (INE), the municipality has a population of 97 inhabitants.

In this small town can find the largest airfield in Europe and the second airfield internationally in extension, it is the private airfield of La Nava, dedicated exclusively to the private flight and especially gliding. It has over two million square meters. It was built during the Spanish Civil War on the side of nationals, supported by the German Air Force, sought an alternative basis for the operation of the Legion.

History 
Formerly named as el Corral'.
Corral de Ayllón was part of the Comunidad de Villa y Tierra de Ayllon

Demographics

See also 
 Comunidad de Villa y Tierra de Ayllón

References

Municipalities in the Province of Segovia